Bull Run is a  tributary of the Occoquan River that originates from a spring in the Bull Run Mountains in Loudoun County, Virginia, and flows south to the Occoquan River. Bull Run serves as the boundary between Loudoun County and Prince William County, and between Fairfax County and Prince William County.

Bull Run is primarily associated with two battles of the American Civil War: the First Battle of Bull Run (July 21, 1861) and the Second Battle of Bull Run (August 28–30, 1862), both Confederate victories. A narrow part of the creek called Yates Ford (near Manassas) is the scene of the Battle of Occoquan, and downstream about one mile is the current Yates Ford Road bridge between Fairfax and Prince William counties.

See also
List of rivers of Virginia

References

External links
Occoquan Watershed Monitoring Laboratory (Virginia)
Northern Virginia Regional Commission, Occoquan Basin Nonpoint Pollution Management Program (Virginia)
Prince William Conservation Alliance
The Potomac Appalachian Trail Club -- Bull Run/Occoquan Trail (Virginia)

Rivers of Virginia
Tributaries of the Potomac River
Rivers of Fairfax County, Virginia
Rivers of Loudoun County, Virginia
Rivers of Prince William County, Virginia